The Forest Mountain pig (Lesogornaya) is an extremely rare breed of pig from Armenia. It is feared that it may die out.

References

External links 
 FAO.org

Pig breeds originating in Armenia
Pig breeds